Caldwell is a township located in Montserrado County, Liberia. Caldwell was one of the four townships established in the first wave of colonization (between 1822 and 1827). It is listed as one of the original settlements comprising the Commonwealth of Liberia in the 1839 Constitution, which was drafted by the American Colonization Society.  The name comes from Elias B. Caldwell and family, about 1816, Presbyterians in what became Caldwell, New Jersey.

Government 
In 2018 President George Weah appointed Francis Woods as Commissioner for Caldwell.

The western parts of Caldwell township (New Georgia Road, Caldwell Community, Central Caldwell) are part of the Montserrado-15 electoral district. The eastern parts of Caldwell township (Caldwell Market, Dixville Water Side, Upper Caldwell, Samukai Town and Cassava Hill) are part of the Montserrado-11 electoral district.

Demographics 
Caldwell township is divided into eight communities;

References

City corporations, townships and borough of the Greater Monrovia District
Populated places established by Americo-Liberians